Stephanotheca is a genus of bryozoans belonging to the family Lanceoporidae.

The species of this genus are found in Europe and Australia.

Species:

Stephanotheca ambita 
Stephanotheca arrogata 
Stephanotheca bahloo 
Stephanotheca barrosoi 
Stephanotheca fayalensis 
Stephanotheca fenestricella 
Stephanotheca ipsum 
Stephanotheca kutyeri 
Stephanotheca monoecensis 
Stephanotheca ochracea 
Stephanotheca perforata 
Stephanotheca romajoyae 
Stephanotheca triangulata 
Stephanotheca victoriensis 
Stephanotheca watersi

References

Bryozoan genera